Todd Miller is a journalist based in Tucson, Arizona. He is the author of Border Patrol Nation: Dispatches from the Front Lines of Homeland Security, Storming the Wall: Climate Change, Migration, and Homeland Security, and Empire of Borders: The Expansion of the U.S. Border Around the World.

Biography
For over a decade and a half, Miller has written about border and immigration issues between the United States and Mexico. He is a contributing editor on the NACLA Report on the Americas’ blog "Border Wars", and his work has also appeared in such places as the New York Times, The Nation, Guernica, and Common Dreams.

Miller lives in Tucson, Arizona. Miller has worked for both Borderlinks in Arizona and Witness for Peace in Oaxaca, Mexico, researching and assisting in resolving immigration issues.

His first book, Border Patrol Nation: Dispatches from the Front Lines of Homeland Security was published in 2014. His second book Storming the Wall: Climate Change, Migration, and Homeland Security was published in 2017 and covers the interrelated nature of human migration, climate change, corporate investment in border militarization, and sustainability and environmental justice movements. And his third book "Empire of Borders: The Expansion of the U.S. Border Around the World" was published in 2019 and traces the externalization of the U.S. border apparatus abroad. His fourth book "Build Bridges, Not Walls: A Journey to a World Without Borders" is a meditation and reflection on his other work that attempts to imagine a new world without border enforcement.  

He currently writes for The Border Chronicle with fellow border journalist Melissa del Bosque.

Bibliography
 Border Patrol Nation: Dispatches from the Front Lines of Homeland Security (City Lights Publishers, 2014) 
 Storming the Wall: Climate Change, Migration, and Homeland Security (City Lights Publishers, 2017) 
 Empire of Borders: The Expansion of the U.S. Border Around the World (Verso Books, 2019) 
 Build Bridges, Not Walls (City Lights Publishers, 2021) .

References

External links 
 
 Todd Miller's former blog

Living people
Journalists from Arizona
Year of birth missing (living people)